Sophia, also spelled Sofia, is a feminine given name, from Greek Σοφία,  Sophía, "Wisdom". Other forms include Sophie, Sophy, and Sofie.
The given name is first recorded in the beginning of the 4th century. It is a common female name in the Eastern Orthodox countries. It became very popular in the West beginning in the later 1990s and became one of the most popularly given girls' names in the Western world in the first decades of the 21st century.

Popularity
Sophia was known as the personification of wisdom by early Christians and Saint Sophia is also an early Christian martyr. Both associations contributed to the usage of the name. The name was comparatively common in continental Europe in the medieval and early modern period.
It was popularized in Britain by the German House of Hanover in the 18th century. 
It was repeatedly popularised among the wider population, by the name of a character in the novel Tom Jones (1794) by Henry Fielding, in The Vicar of Wakefield (1766) by Oliver Goldsmith, and in the 1960s by Italian actress Sophia Loren (b. 1934).

Sophia was comparatively popular in the United States in the late 19th and early 20th century; its use declined in the 1920s to 1950s; it became again moderately popular during the 1960s to 1980s.

During the 1990s to the 2010s, the popularity of the name rose dramatically in many countries throughout the western world. Suggested influences for this trend include Sofía Vergara and Sofia Coppola (popular from the late 1990s) and Sofia Hellqvist (popular from the 2000s).
Sophia  and variants of the name remain among the most currently popularly given names for girls in countries across Europe as well as countries in North and South America, Australia, New Zealand, and others.

Name variants
Greek Σοφία was adopted without significant phonological changes into numerous languages, 
as Sophia (German, and thence English)
and Sofia (Romance languages, and thence also to Germanic languages and Finnish, etc.).
The spelling Soffia is Icelandic and Welsh. Hungarian has Zsófia.
Modern Spanish uses the acute diacritic, Sofía.
South and East Slavic and Baltic languages have Sofija (Софија), Sofiya (София) and Sofya (Софья).
West Slavic (Polish and Czech-Slovak) introduced a voiced sibilant, Zofia, Žofia, Žofie.

French has the (disyllabic) hypocoristic  Sophie, which was also introduced in German, Dutch/Flemish, English
and Scandinavian in the spelling Sofie and Sophy.
A Dutch hypocoristic is Sofieke.
Russian has the hypocoristic Соня (Sonya), which in the late 19th century was introduced to Western languages, in the spellings Sonya, Sonia and Sonja, via characters with this name in the novels  Crime and Punishment by Fyodor Dostoyevsky (1866, English translation 1885) and War and Peace by Leo Tolstoy (1869, English translation 1886).

Turkish Safiye is from the unrelated Arabic Safiyya ( "pure").

Persian Sofia (Persian: صوفیا) is from unrelated Sufi, a sect of Islam.

People

Saints
 Saint Sophia of Milan, feast day 17 September
 Saint Sophia of Rome,  martyr, feast day 15 May
 Saint Sophia of Sortino (Sicily), martyr, feast day 23 September
 Saint Sophia of Fermo (March of Ancona), feast day 30 April
 Saints Sophia and Irene of Egypt (3rd century), feast day 4 June
 Saint Sophia of Thrace (9th century), feast day 4 June
 Saint Sofia of Suzdal (d. 1542), see Solomonia Yuryevna Saburova
 Saint Sophia of Slutsk (d. 1612), see Sophia Olelkovich Radziwill

Royalty

Sofia
 Sofia of Bavaria Wittelsbach (1376–1425), Queen of Bohemia
 Queen Sofía of Spain (born 1938), Queen consort of Spain
 Princess Sofia, Duchess of Värmland (born 1984), wife of Prince Carl Philip, Duke of Värmland
 Infanta Sofía of Spain (born 2007), Spanish princess

Sophia
 Sophia (530–c. 601), Byzantine empress
 Sophia of Minsk (d. 1198), Danish queen
 Sophia Palaiologina (1455–1503), Grand Duchess of Moscow
 Sophia Stuart (1606), daughter of James VI and I
 Sophia of Hanover (1630–1714), heir to the English throne
 Sophia Dorothea of Schleswig-Holstein-Sonderburg-Glücksburg (1636–1689), German noblewoman
 Sophia Alekseyevna (1657–1704), Russian regent
 Sophia Dorothea of Celle (1666–1726), Duchess of Brunswick-Lüneburg, wife of George I of Great Britain
 Sophia Dorothea of Hanover (1687–1757), Queen consort of Prussia, daughter of George I of Great Britain
 Sophia Magdalen of Brandenburg-Kulmbach (1700–1770), Queen consort of Denmark-Norway
 Princess Sophia Dorothea of Prussia (1719–1765), daughter of Frederick William I of Prussia and Sophia Dorothea of Hanover
 Margravine Sophia Dorothea of Brandenburg-Schwedt (1736–1798), Duchess of Württemberg
 Sophia Frederica of Mecklenburg-Schwerin (1758–1794), Princess and Duchess of Mecklenburg-Schwerin
 Princess Augusta Sophia of the United Kingdom (1768–1840), Duchess of Brunswick and Lüneburg
 Princess Sophia of the United Kingdom (1777–1848), British princess
 Princess Sophia of Gloucester (1773–1844), British princess
 Sophia Sidney, Baroness De L'Isle and Dudley (1796–1837), daughter of William IV
 Sophia of Nassau (1836–1913), Queen consort of Sweden and Norway
 Sophia of Prussia (1870–1932), Queen consort of Greece

other versions
 Safiye Sultan (1550–1619), wife of Murad III, mother of Mehmed III; originally named Sofia
 Princess Sophie of Greece and Denmark (1914–2001), later Princess of Hesse, Princes of Hannover
 Sophie, Duchess of Edinburgh (born 1965), wife of Prince Edward, Duke of Edinburgh

Arts and entertainment industry
 Sofia (Swedish singer) (nee Sofia Berntson), Swedish singer
 Sophia Abrahão (born 1991), Brazilian actress
 Sophia Agranovich, Ukrainian-American pianist, recording artist and music educator
 Sophia Aliberti (born 1963), Greek actress and TV presenter
 Sofia Andres, (born 1998), Filipina actress and commercial model
 Sofia Carson (born 1993), American singer and actress
 Sofiko Chiaureli (1937–2008), Georgian actress
 Sofia Coppola (born 1971), American actress and director
 Sophia de Mello Breyner Andresen (1919–2004), Portuguese poet
 Sophia Baddeley (1745–1786), English actress
 Sophia Bush (born 1982), American actress
 Sophia Di Martino (born 1983), English actress
 Sofia Djama, Algerian film director
 Sofie Dossi (born 2001), American contortionist
 Sophia Dussek (1775–1831), Scottish composer
 Sofia Essaïdi (born 1984), Franco-Moroccan singer
 Sofia Gubaidulina (born 1931), Russian-Tatar composer
 Sophia Peabody Hawthorne (1809–1871), American painter
 Sophia Jex-Blake (1840–1912), English physician
 Sofia Karlsson (born 1975), Swedish musician
 Sophia Karp (1861–1904), Romanian actress
 Sophia Kokosalaki (1972–2019), Greek fashion designer
 Zofia Kossak-Szczucka (1889–1968), Polish writer
 Sophia Laskaridou, Greek artist
 Sophia Lee (1750–1824), English novelist
 Sophia Loren (born 1934), Italian actress
 Sofia Martins de Sousa (1870–1960), Portuguese painter
 Sophia McDougall (born 1979), British author
 Sophia Michahelles (born 1976), American puppeteer
 Sofia Milos (born 1969), Swiss actress
 Sophia Myles (born 1980), English actress
 Zofia Nałkowska, Polish writer, author of Medallions
 Sophia Yakovlevna Parnok (1885–1933), Russian poet
 Sofia Reyes, Mexican singer and songwriter
 Sophia Romero, American writer
 Sofia Rotaru (born 1947), Ukrainian singer
 Sofia Samatar (born 1971), Somali-American writer
 Sophia Senoron (born 1999), Filipino actress, host, model and a beauty pageant titleholder
 Sophia Sergio (born 1992), Italian beauty pageant titleholder
 Sofia Shinas (born 1968), Canadian artist
 Sofia Tarasova, Ukrainian singer and actress
 Sofía Tartilán (1829–1888), Spanish writer
 Sophie Turner (born 1996), English Actress
 Sofia Vembo, Greek singer
 Sofia Vassilieva (born 1992), American actress 
 Sofía Vergara (born 1972), Colombian model and actress
 Sophia Vossou (born 1961), Greek singer
 Sofia Wylie (born 2004), American actress
 Sophia Yan (born 1986), American classical pianist
 Sofie Zamchick (born 1994), American singer and actress

Sports
 Sofia Akhmeteli (born 1981), Georgian alpine skier 
 Sofia Arvidsson (born 1984), Swedish tennis player
 Sofia Asoumanaki, Greek rower
 Sophia Diagne (born 1998), Senegalese swimmer
 Sophia Ellis (born 1996), British powerlifter
 Sofia Bekatorou (born 1977), Greek sailor and Olympic gold medalist
 Sofiya Bozhanova (born 1967), Bulgarian long and triple jump
 Sophia Flörsch (born 2000), German racing driver
 Sofia Goggia (born 1992), Italian World Cup alpine ski racer
 Sophia Elizabeth Herzog (born 1997), American swimmer
 Sofia Iosifidou, Greek water polo player
 Sofia Kenin, American tennis player
 Sophia Koggouli, Greek footballer
 Sofia Konukh (born 1980), Russian water polo player
 Sophia Morgan, Fijian sailor
 Sofía Mulánovich (born 1983), Peruvian surfer
 Sofia Muratova (1929–2006), Russian gymnast
 Sofia Papadopoulou (born 1983), Greek sailor
 Sophia Papamichalopoulou (born 1990), alpine skier who represented Cyprus
 Sofia Polgar, Hungarian-born Israeli and Canadian chess grandmaster
 Sofia Riga, Greek runner
 Sofia Sakorafa (born 1957), Greek javelin thrower and politician
 Sofia Tikhonova (born 1998), Russian ski jumper
 Sophia Warner (born 1974), Paralympian track and field athlete from England
 Sofia Yfantidou, Greek track and field athlete

Other
 Sophia Aggelonitis, Canadian politician
  Sofia Amloh (born 1986), Swedish politician
 Sophia Hayden Bennett (1868–1953), American architect
 Sophia Brahe (1556–1643), Danish astronomer
 Sophia Chan (born 1958), Hong Kong professor and politician
 Sophia Collier (born 1956), American entrepreneur
 Sophia Drossopoulou, Greek computer scientist
 Sophia Eckerson (1880–1954), American botanist and microchemist
 Sophia Forero (born 1967), American jewelry designer
 Sophia Getzowa (1872–1946), Belarusian-Israeli pathologist and scientist
 Sophia Orne Johnson (1826–1899), American author
 Sofia Kovalevskaya (1850–1891), Russian mathematician
 Sophie Lancaster (1986–2007), English murder victim
 Sophia Leung (born 1933), Canadian politician
 Sofie Lippert (born 1995), Danish politician
 Sophia Lösche, German murder victim
 Sophia Lvovna Perovskaya (1853–1881), Russian revolutionary
 Sofia Manzano (born 1971), Brazilian politician
 Sofia Richie (born 1998), American fashion model, daughter of Lionel Richie
 Sophie Scholl (1921–1943), German student and anti-Nazi political activist
 Sophia D. Stoddard, American educator
 Sofia Tekela-Smith (born 1970), New Zealand artist
 Sophia Wilson (1860–1???), Japanese courtesan and wife of Captain John Wilson

Fictional characters
Princess Sofia, main character from the animated TV show Sofia the First
 Sophie Amundsen, main character from the novel Sophie's World
 Sofia Constantinas, from the comic Wonder Woman
 Sofia Curtis, from the TV series CSI: Crime Scene Investigation
 Sofia Johnson, from film The Color Purple
 Sofia Dupre, a character on the American soap opera The Young and the Restless 
 Sofia Lamb, from the video game BioShock 2
 Sofia Petrovna, a character from the novel of the same name
 Sofia Sartor from the video game Assassin's Creed: Revelations
 Sofia Serrano from the film Vanilla Sky
 Sofia Robbin Sloan Torres, daughter of Callie Torres, Mark Sloan, and Arizona Robbins from Grey's Anatomy
 Sophia, playable character from Fire Emblem: Fūin no Tsurugi
 Sophia Aubrey, from the Aubrey-Maturin series of novels by Patrick O'Brian
 Sophia Esteed, from the video game Star Ocean: Till the End of Time
 Sophia Forrester, from the animated TV series Last Exile
 Sophia Hapgood, from the video game Indiana Jones and the Fate of Atlantis
 Sophia Lopez, from the TV series Nip/Tuck
 Sophia Peletier, from the TV series and comic books The Walking Dead
 Sophia Petrillo, from the TV series The Golden Girls
 Sophia Marlowe, from the TV series Girlboss
 Sophia Tutu, a character from the animated TV series The Raccoons
 Sophia Western, main heroine of the novel The History of Tom Jones
 Sophie, from the video game Tales of Graces
 Sophie Neveu Saint-Clair, character in Dan Brown's book The Da Vinci Code
 Sophie Zawistowska, the title character of the novel and movie Sophie's Choice
Sophia, a fictional character from the video game Professor Layton and the Diabolical Box
Sofia Porter, technician of the MD-5 group and Lucinia's sister in the Meta Runner internet series.
Sophie Norton, from the Nickelodeon series Genie in the House
Sophie Hatter, from the book and movie Howl's Moving Castle
Mother Sophia, a key historical figure in Xenogears
Sophia, a character who fuses demons for the protagonist in Shin Megami Tensei V

See also
 Sophie (disambiguation)
 Sonia (name)
 SOFIA

References

External links
 NamepediA Blog - The Journey of the Name Sophia

Greek feminine given names
Bulgarian feminine given names
English feminine given names
Spanish feminine given names
Italian feminine given names
Russian feminine given names
Slovak feminine given names
Romanian feminine given names
Given names of Greek language origin
Lists of people by given name